The 1994 Palm Sunday tornado outbreak was the third notable US tornado outbreak to occur on Palm Sunday and the second to take place in the Southeastern United States. The outbreak produced 29 tornadoes from Texas to North Carolina, killing 40 people and injuring 491, and causing $140 million in damage. The deadliest storm of the outbreak, as well as in the US in 1994, was an F4 tornado that devastated Piedmont, Alabama. It struck the Goshen United Methodist Church right in the middle of the Palm Sunday service, collapsing the roof on the congregation and killing 20 people inside, including the Rev. Kelly Clem's 4-year-old daughter Hannah. Two other houses of worship were also destroyed mid-service.

Meteorological synopsis 

The SPC started forecasting the outbreak on March 26, highlighting the risk of severe thunderstorms over the area that would eventually be impacted. They issued a "severe" forecast for most of the Southern, and some of the Mid-Atlantic states, forecasting "the potential for supercell storms, along with the possibility of tornadoes."

By the morning of March 27, it was apparent that a very strong and potent airmass had set up over the Gulf states, with the SPC issuing a moderate risk for most of Alabama, the southern half of Mississippi, and most of Louisiana in their morning outlook. The 6 AM CST (1200 UTC) 500 MB analysis showed a strong southwest flow of near 80 knots over the Southern U.S., while at the 850 MB level, there existed winds of near 50 knots coming out of the state of Louisiana. At the surface, temperatures in Alabama, Mississippi, and Georgia were in the low 70's Fahrenheit, with dewpoints were in the upper 60's to low 70's. CAPE values at Centreville, Alabama were nearing 1,200 j/kg with no cap to speak of. A surface front left by rain during the previous evening was situated over northern parts of Alabama, Mississippi, and Georgia.

By 9 AM CST (1500 UTC), thunderstorms and severe weather were not only occurring along the boundary setup by the rain from the previous evening in the northern portions of Alabama and Mississippi, but further to the south as well. At 9:18 AM CST (1518 UTC), the SPC issued a tornado watch for Eastern Mississippi and Northern Alabama. The storms then rapidly intensified, with tornado warnings being issued by the Birmingham and Huntsville NWS offices before 11 AM local time. Both the deadly F4 tornado that struck the Goshen United Methodist Church in Cherokee County and the Marshall County F2 twister formed at about this time. The SPC also issued a PDS Tornado Watch for all of Northern Georgia by 12 PM EST (1700 UTC), with the wording stating, "This is a particularly dangerous situation with the possibility of very damaging tornadoes. Also, large hail, dangerous lightning and damaging thunderstorm winds can be expected." Severe storms and tornadoes tracked into the northern Georgia region by 12:42 EST, and tornadoes continued to track across northern Georgia during the afternoon.

During the early-mid afternoon, analysis showed a very unstable airmass over the southern U.S., with CAPE values near 2,500 j/kg and SRH values of near 250 m2/s2 at Jackson, Mississippi. The 1800 UTC Centreville, Alabama sounding showed similar conditions, with CAPE over 2,500 j/kg and SRH values of over 500 m2/s2. This resulted in an EHI value of 8.49, which is strongly supportive of tornadic thunderstorms. Based on these soundings, the SPC issued a High Risk for their 1930 UTC outlook, noting a rapidly destabilized atmosphere and winds being much stronger than what was originally forecasted. Noting the presence of a shortwave trough that was tracking into Mississippi and Louisiana as well as rapidly falling pressures in advance of a frontal boundary, the SPC issued a tornado watch for eastern Louisiana and central Mississippi, however, there were no reported tornadoes in this region on March 27. The SPC, seeing that storms were tracking into the Carolinas, issued a tornado watch for portions of the western and central Carolinas, as well as the portion of northeast Georgia not already included in the prior tornado watch. Tornadoes continued to track along this area from the mid-late afternoon, with an F3 tornado striking parts of northeast Georgia and the upstate of South Carolina, injuring 12, and another tornado along the border region of North Carolina and South Carolina injuring 13.

In Alabama, tornadoes continued in the central part of the state during the mid-late afternoon. An F1 tornado struck parts of Tuscaloosa County just after 4 PM. Funnel clouds were seen in Hueytown as a storm went over Jefferson County at around 4:30 PM local time. An F2 tornado was produced in Shelby County at 5:30 CST, damaging a high school and a residential neighborhood before destroying two mobile home parks.

During the cleanup from the F4 tornado that struck Cherokee County, emergency responders had to take cover as another funnel cloud was spotted just before 6 PM CST. The storm system also left behind extensive flooding in Winston and Walker Counties, with $150,000 worth of damage done to roads and bridges in Walker County. The final tornado of the outbreak was reported just before midnight in Greenville County in South Carolina. The National Weather Service offices in Birmingham, Atlanta, and Athens did not stop issuing warnings until late at night on the 27th or early in the morning on the 28th, issuing 75 tornado warnings and 182 severe weather products overall.

Overall, the outbreak of March 27, 1994 was not as synoptically evident as some of the past outbreaks that have occurred, as there was no deep surface low or trough present for forcing in the area where the storms occurred, and many the ingredients necessary that were the cause of this outbreak were not able to be forecasted until the morning of the event.

Confirmed tornadoes

March 27 event

Ragland - Piedmont - Rock Run, Alabama 

CST. With a  forward speed, the tornado first destroyed buildings east of Ragland before killing a woman on a campground west of Neely Henry Lake. Just prior to entering Calhoun County, the tornado destroyed 18 homes and 20 mobile homes. Upon crossing the north side of Ohatchee the tornado threw a van into a ditch, killing a man inside and injuring three other occupants. As it passed north of Piedmont, the tornado struck the Goshen United Methodist Church in the former community of Goshen, killing 20 people in the church and injuring 92; some sources say 90 were injured. The tornado also destroyed two nearby churches, but killed no one in their congregations. Parishioners in the Goshen United Methodist Church apparently received no warning while attending services and so were crushed to death as the walls and roof collapsed upon them. Overall, the tornado killed 22 people.

Rome–Canton–Jasper, Georgia 

EST. The tornado blew down 20 large trees and damaged power lines in Cassville.

The tornado also severely damaged eight to 10 other homes and slightly damaged 12–15. Overall, the tornado was most destructive at Indian Springs and soon weakened as it continued northeast through wooded lands; however, its path briefly widened.

Ultimately, it caused almost $7 million (1994 USD) in losses to properties and businesses in Bartow County alone, with another $1.5 million in losses in adjourning Pickens County. The tornado killed three people and over 500,000 chickens along its track and leveled "thousands" of trees, with over $10 million in losses to agricultural interests.

Cave Spring/Lindale, Georgia 

EST. Though mainly impacting rural areas at first, it badly damaged four wood homes and blew down many trees with resultant F1 damage. The tornado appeared reddish to eyewitnesses as it passed through rugged terrain. As it crossed near SR 100, the tornado produced major roof damage to a few homes and destroyed a pair of chicken coops.

There, it reportedly leveled "fifteen mixed single and two story mixed brick and wood homes of poor construction," along with some homes that were being built. The tornado caused 30 injuries, including one of a man who was thrown  into the street across from his home. Residents reported continuous lightning preceding and during the passage of the tornado and were alerted by their dogs barking. Some residents also reported a smaller tornado south of the primary one.

There, it badly damaged three poorly built wood homes, destroyed four mobile homes, and uprooted large trees. According to the National Weather Service, the tornado destroyed 55–60 homes and did at least some damage to 140–150 others, with total losses reaching $6,750,000.

Effects on National Safety 

The deaths at Goshen United Methodist Church brought to light the deficiencies in the NOAA Weather Radio network across the United States and the lack of NOAA Weather Radio use in many public spaces. Budget cuts in the 1970s had forced the National Weather Service to cut back on the expansion of new broadcast stations. Most urban and suburban areas in the country had sufficient coverage, but many rural areas had no coverage at all. After a visit to the Goshen site, then Vice President Al Gore pushed for further funding and expansion of the NOAA Weather Radio system, especially in rural areas. This was accomplished through an expansion of private-public partnerships, primarily by the National Weather Service leasing or using donated tower space from entities such as TV stations, public utilities, and state government agencies. Gore, also, pushed for facilities such as schools, hospitals, churches, and nursing homes to have weather radios on hand.

See also 
 1920 Palm Sunday tornado outbreak
 1965 Palm Sunday tornado outbreak
 2020 Easter tornado outbreak
 Tornado outbreak sequence of March 24–28, 2021

References

Bibliography 
 
 

 Hamilton, David W., Yuh-Lang Lin, Ronald P. Weglarz, Michael L. Kaplan (1998). "Jetlet Formation from Diabatic Forcing with Applications to the 1994 Palm Sunday Tornado Outbreak". Monthly Weather Review, 126 (8).
 Kaplan, Michael L., Yuh-Lang Lin, David W. Hamilton, Robert A. Rozumalski (1998). "The Numerical Simulation of an Unbalanced Jetlet and Its Role in the Palm Sunday 1994 Tornado Outbreak in Alabama and Georgia". Monthly Weather Review, 126 (8).
 Koch, Steven E., David Hamilton, Devin Kramer, Adam Langmaid (1998). "Mesoscale Dynamics in the Palm Sunday Tornado Outbreak". Monthly Weather Review, 126 (8).
 Langmaid, Adam H., Allen J. Riordan (1998). "Surface Mesoscale Processes during the 1994 Palm Sunday Tornado Outbreak". Monthly Weather Review, 126 (8).

Further information

External links 
 Palm Sunday Tornado Outbreak March 27, 1994 (NWS Birmingham, Alabama)
 NWS Service Assessment
 Map of the 1994 Palm Sunday tornado outbreak The Tornado History Project
 Palm Sunday Killer Tornadoes 

F4 tornadoes by date
 ,1994-03-27
Tornadoes of 1994
Tornadoes in Alabama
 ,1994-03-27
 ,1994-03-27
 ,1994-03-27
1994-03-27,Tornado
1994
Tornado outbreaks
March 1994 events in the United States
1994 in Texas
1994 in Alabama
1994 in Georgia (U.S. state)
1994 in North Carolina
1994 in South Carolina